Malcolm Lewis Heron is an electrical engineer at James Cook University in Townsville, Queensland, Australia. He was named a Fellow of the Institute of Electrical and Electronics Engineers (IEEE) in 2012 for his contributions to the application of radio science to oceanic and terrestrial remote sensing.

References 

Fellow Members of the IEEE
Living people
Australian computer scientists
Academic staff of James Cook University
Year of birth missing (living people)